A79 or A-79 may refer to:

 A79 motorway (France)
 A79 road, a major road in the United Kingdom
 A79 motorway (Netherlands)
 Benoni Defense, in the Encyclopaedia of Chess Openings
 Calder Highway, in Victoria, Australia, designated A79
 Chignik Lake Airport, an airport in Alaska, designated by the FAA LID "A79"
 .a79, a file extension for programming ARM microcontrollers